Woowoonga is a locality in the North Burnett Region, Queensland, Australia.

Geography 
Degilbo Creek forms the south-western boundary of the locality.

A number of creeks rises in the mountainous area of the locality and then flow west or north through the locality.

The Isis Highway passes through the locality near its western boundary.

History 
Woowoonga Creek Provisional School on 17 January 1898 and became Woowoonga Creek State School on 1 January 1909 only to close that same year.

Woowoonga East State opened on 14 Apr 1909 and closed circa 1943.

Mount Woowoonga State School opened on 1 April 1932 and closed circa 1946.

Education 
There are no schools in Wowoonga. The nearest primary schools are in neighbouring Biggenden and Dallarnil. The nearest secondary schools are in Biggenden (to Year 10) and in Childers (to Year 12).

References 

North Burnett Region
Localities in Queensland